IZair serves the following destinations (at December 2012):

Europe
Austria
Vienna – Vienna Airport
France
Mulhouse – EuroAirport Basel-Mulhouse-Freiburg
Germany
Düsseldorf – Düsseldorf Airport
Munich – Munich Airport
Stuttgart – Stuttgart Airport
Greece
Athens – Athens International Airport
Netherlands
Amsterdam – Amsterdam Airport Schiphol
Northern Cyprus
Nicosia – Ercan International Airport
Switzerland
Zürich – Zürich Airport
Turkey
Adana – Adana Şakirpaşa Airport
Ankara – Ankara Esenboğa Airport
Antalya – Antalya Airport Hub
Bodrum-Milas – Milas–Bodrum Airport
Diyarbakır – Diyarbakır Airport
İstanbul – Istanbul Atatürk Airport
İzmir – Adnan Menderes Airport Hub
Samsun – Çarşamba Airport
Trabzon – Trabzon Airport
Elazığ – Elazığ Airport
Van Province – Van Ferit Melen Airport
United Kingdom
London – London Stansted Airport

References

Lists of airline destinations